Mount Trident is a prominent peak (2,480 m) with three closely spaced summits, rising above Trigon Bluff on the north side of Tucker Glacier in Victoria Land, Antarctica. So named by New Zealand Geological Survey Antarctic Expedition (NZGSAE), 1957–58, because of the three summits.

Mountains of Victoria Land
Borchgrevink Coast